Kayı can refer to:

 Kayı (tribe)
 Kayı, Çorum
 Kayı, Ilgaz
 Kayı, Kemer
 Kayı, Mecitözü
 Kayı, Oğuzlar